Aleksi Paananen (born 25 January 1993) is a Finnish football player currently playing for Finnish Veikkausliiga side Inter Turku. He is often labeled as Thiago Alcantara or Diego Maradona of Finnish football, of which the latter he got the nickname ”Diego”.

Career

FC Inter Turku
On 1 November 2018, Inter Turku announced the signing of Paananen for the 2019 season. He signed a 2-year deal.

With january 2023 years player FC HJK (free agent transfer).

References
  Profile at kups.fi

External links

1993 births
Living people
Finnish footballers
Kuopion Palloseura players
FC Inter Turku players
Veikkausliiga players
Pallo-Kerho 37 players
Association football midfielders
People from Siilinjärvi
Sportspeople from North Savo